Lustrum:  (English: "International research reports in the field of classical antiquity") is a refereed review journal in the field of classical studies. Each volume typically contains only two articles, reviewing scholarship on a particular author, genre, or other subject within a specified timeframe. Articles appear in a variety of languages, including German and English. Lustrum is published by Vandenhoeck & Ruprecht in Göttingen. The first volume of Lustrum was published in 1957 and was for the year 1956; volumes are published annually. , its editors are Marcus Deufert and Irmgard Männlein-Robert.

Scope and overview
Lustrum mostly focuses on bibliographies of ancient Greek and Roman authors and genres of literature, although other bibliographies of other topics such as archaeology, grammar, mathematics, meter, music, and paleography have occasionally been published; there have also been a couple of bibliographies concerned with the history of the field of classical studies. Typically these have lengthy bibliographies, overviewing research trends; quite often an index accompanies each article. Indices are sometimes needed because works discussed are typically not listed alphabetically; they can appear at the end of the article or the end of the entire volume. Articles can be written in German, English, French, Italian, or Latin.

In principle, these reports were supposed to come out every five years; a lustrum was a five-year period of time in Ancient Rome. For instance, Luc Brisson wrote a bibliography on Plato covering the periods 1958–1975, and then with H. Ioannidi he wrote subsequent bibliographies for the five-year periods: 1975–1980, 1980–1985, and 1985–1990. Some bibliographical articles can be quite lengthy and cover a much wider span of scholarship; an article by University of Thessaloniki professor Ioannis Touloumakos which covered scholarship on Aristotle's Politics during the period 1925–1985 is 700 pages long and took twelve years to be fully published.

Each article is typically at least a few dozen pages long. Although most volumes contain two or three articles, some volumes consist of a single book-length bibliography. Several of these volumes have been the subjects of academic book reviews.

History
Lustrum was seen as the successor to Bursian's . Plans to create this new journal were first made during the August 1954 meeting of the International Congress of Classical Studies. It was initially subsidized by UNESCO with support from the International Federation of Associations of Classical Studies. Mette and Thierfelder were friends from university, and Thierfelder had been Bursians Jahresbericht final editor. The first volume was published in 1957 by Vandenhoeck & Ruprecht in Göttingen, Germany, and included three articles—including one by Mette on Homeric scholarship.

Editors
Mette and Thierfelder co-edited the first 27 volumes of Lustrum together until their deaths, which occurred a few days apart from each other in April 1986. Gärtner and Petersmann co-edited Lustrum until Petersmann's death in 2001, prior to the publication of volume 41 for the year 1999.  began co-editing with Gärtner in 2000, starting with for volume 42. Gärtner stopped co-editing Lustrum in 2011. He retired after working there for twenty-five years due to his age, and  became his successor at Lustrum. Deufert, Gärtner, and Weißenberger all co-edited volume 53. Irmgard Männlein-Robert became Weißenberger's successor following his retirement; Deufert, Männlein-Robert, and Weißenberger co-edited volume 60 which was Weißenberger's last. , Deufert and Männlein-Robert are still Lustrum'''s editors.

Indexing and abstracting servicesLustrum is indexed in the following bibliographic databases:

 IBZ Online Periodicals Index Online L'Année philologique Linguistic Bibliography DIALNET Dietrich's Index Philosophicus RILM Abstracts of Music LiteratureReception
A 1962 survey of 51 libraries in Great Britain found that 37 of them included Lustrum in their collection. A 1974 review in Reference Services Review called it "one of several highly useful bibliographical tools in the field of Classics", and a 2009 review in Magazines for Libraries said it was "[r]ecommended for libraries that support a strong classics program". Lustrum is also mentioned as a resource in various guides to reference materials for classics and related fields; Fred W. Jenkins described the series in his 2006 book as "quite useful for keeping abreast of the literature on a wide range of authors and topics".

See also
 L'Année philologique''

References

Further reading

 
 
 
 
 
 

Classics journals
Review journals
Publications established in 1956
Academic journals published in Germany
Annual journals
Multilingual journals